Stephen Melton (born 3 October 1978) is an English former footballer who played as a midfielder.

He played as a professional in the Football League from 1996 until 2006, featuring for Nottingham Forest, Stoke City, Brighton & Hove Albion, Hull City and Boston United. At Non-League level he has represented Tamworth and King's Lynn before re-joining Boston United and then moving on to Lincoln United, Lincoln Moorlands Railway and Grantham Town.

Career
Born in Lincoln, Melton started his career back in 1996 as a trainee with Nottingham Forest. He made his debut for Forest in the Premier League on the last day of the 1998-99 season against Leicester City. Melton only appeared for Forest on three occasions in the league before moving on to Stoke City in February 2000. At Stoke, made seven appearances in 1999–2000 and was an unused substitute in the 2000 Football League Trophy Final. He joined Brighton & Hove Albion in the summer of 2000. Melton managed to find his way into the starting eleven and played 46 league games in which he scored three goals. In November 2002, he joined Hull City after spending time on loan with the club. Although he never scored in a competitive game for Hull City, he was the first player to score at their Kingston Communications Stadium in a friendly against Sunderland to commemorate the stadium's opening on 18 December 2002.

Melton joined Boston United in March 2004 on a contract until summer 2005. During his time with The Pilgrims, Melton was sent out on loan to Conference National side Tamworth. He was released by Boston United in summer 2006. Melton joined King's Lynn in 2006. He re-signed for Boston United in September 2008, but was released at the end of the season. Melton went on trial with Retford United in July 2009, but subsequently joined Lincoln United alongside former King's Lynn and Boston United teammate Matt O'Halloran. In February 2011 he signed with Lincoln Moorlands Railway. He joined Grantham Town in the summer.

Career statistics

A.  The "Other" column constitutes appearances and goals in the Football League play-offs, and Football League Trophy.

References

External links
 

1978 births
Living people
English footballers
Nottingham Forest F.C. players
Stoke City F.C. players
Brighton & Hove Albion F.C. players
Hull City A.F.C. players
Boston United F.C. players
Tamworth F.C. players
King's Lynn F.C. players
Lincoln United F.C. players
Grantham Town F.C. players
Worksop Town F.C. players
Association football midfielders
Premier League players
English Football League players
Northern Premier League players
Lincoln Moorlands Railway F.C. players